Vorobzha , rural localities in Russia, may refer to:

 Vorobzha, Medvensky District, Kursk Oblast, a khutor
 Vorobzha, Sudzhansky District, Kursk Oblast, a selo

 Also
 Vorobzha (river), a left tributary of the Seym River